George Bagby is the name of:
George Bagby (author) (1906–1985), American novelist
George William Bagby (1828–1883), American librarian
George Bagby (politician) (born 1937), Democratic member of the Wyoming House of Representatives